The Chevrolet Venture is a minivan produced by General Motors for the 1997 to 2005 model years. The Chevrolet Venture, along with most of its General Motors minivan siblings, was built at GM's Doraville, Georgia, assembly plant.

Use of name
The Venture name was first used on a 1988 Chevrolet concept car, in this case a full-sized four-door sedan more aerodynamic than the 1991-1996 Chevrolet Caprice.

History

The Venture was introduced in 1996 for the 1997 model year as a replacement for the radically styled Lumina APV. In the United States, it was also sold as the Oldsmobile Silhouette and the Pontiac Trans Sport, which was later renamed as the Pontiac Montana for 1999 (2000 in Canada).  The Venture came in three trim levels, the base, LS, and LT. The base models of the Venture were short wheelbase models which came equipped with cloth upholstery, front bucket seats with fixed head restraints, a 2nd-row 2-passenger bench seat, and steel wheels. The LS came in both short and long wheelbases, and offered aluminum wheels, a varied seating configuration, adjustable head restraints, side airbags, power windows (optional on the base models), and a remote keyless entry system. The LT model was an upscale of the LS and was exclusively a long wheelbase model and offered a power driver seat (optional on the base and LS models), optional leather seats, a roof rack (optional on the base and LS models), and a driver side sliding door (optional on the base and LS models from 1997 to 1999). The anti-lock brakes were standard on all Ventures from 1996 to 2002, but became optional on the base models later on.

All Ventures used a four-speed automatic transmission. The Venture was one of the few minivans to have an 8-passenger seating configuration as an option when most minivans seated up to 7 passengers. In 2000, the driver side sliding door became standard on all trim levels, when the passenger side only sliding door models of minivans have rapidly fallen out of favor since the 1996 models of Chrysler minivans. The exterior was refreshed in 2001, a back-up alarm was added to indicate possible obstacles behind the vehicle, and all-wheel drive was introduced in 2002. Also for 2002 was a new steering wheel equivalent to the 2000-2005 Chevrolet Impala, replacing the steering wheel equivalent to the 1995-2001 Chevrolet Lumina. New for this generation, cabin air filters were installed, and the filters can be accessed from behind an access panel easily accessed from inside the glove compartment.

The optional 2-3-2 seating configuration was dropped in favor of the more conventional 2-2-3 and 2-3-3 seating configurations. The 2-3-3 was the standard for the Chinese-made Buick GL8, and a 10-seats arranged in a 3-4-3 configuration was used in a Chinese-made version of the Chevrolet Venture for export to the Philippines and Latin America (where it sold alongside the U.S. Venture) where 10-seaters are favored with lower taxes. Reviews and sales were generally lukewarm, especially about the relatively narrow cabin due to being designed for European roads. Models came in both short and long wheelbases, and with optional all-wheel drive. The third row bench seat was designed to fold flat (introduced for 2001 and available on LS and Warner Bros. models), but forming a higher floor unlike the Honda, Mazda and Nissan minivans that folded into a well behind the third row.

The Venture was replaced after 2005 by the Chevrolet Uplander, which was essentially a facelift with one long wheelbase configuration, and a longer nose which served chiefly to improve crush distance and styling more like an SUV. Only the long-wheelbase Venture was sold for 2005 in the US but the short-wheelbase was still offered in Canada. Production of the Chevy Venture ended on June 24, 2005.

Model year changes
1997 model year-Introduction of the base model in early 1997. The 1997-1999 Ventures were their new version. The LS model is also introduced.
1998 model year-power sliding doors and available OnStar were options on all models.
1999 model year-A new Warner Bros. Edition is also introduced for the 1999 model year on the Venture, along with a built-in TV system with a DVD-player and a built-in VCR system as well.
2000 model year-
2001 model year (refresh)-OnStar is now a standard feature on the Venture. The Venture had also received a mid-cycle refresh with a redesigned front grille that matches the Chevrolet Impala's front grille. The 2001 Venture had also received a redesigned new steering wheel.
2003 model year-More equipment packages were introduced for 2003. The Venture is now available with XM Satellite Radio.
2004 model year-The LT trim is discontinued.
2005 model year-This is the last year for the Venture. The Venture is unchanged. All-wheel-drive is discontinued. The short-wheelbase version of the Venture is now only available to rental car companies and to the fleet-market for the 2005 model year. The last Venture was produced on June 24, 2005. The Venture is replaced with the Uplander.

Warner Bros. Edition
A Warner Bros. edition, introduced in 1999 as part of an overall deal between GM and Warner Bros., included leather and cloth seats, standard built–in child restraints, Warner Bros. badging with Bugs Bunny leaning on the Warner Bros. Shield logo, and a DVD entertainment system, a novelty at the time (VHS players were offered at first; DVD capability was added for the 2002 model year, with the VHS option dropped).

The Warner Bros. edition was only produced for the 2000–2003 model years and the only model to come with a monochromatic exterior (like its Silhouette twin) as opposed to black accents that the other Ventures offered and this model only came in four colors: Blue, red, silver, and black. These models included a complementary membership in VentureTainment, which sent free gifts to owners of the van, including VHS and DVD compilations of Looney Tunes (as well as other Warner Bros. Family Entertainment titles), a cooler with can holders, a special keychain and other perks (including discounts at the Warner Bros. Studio Stores and Six Flags theme parks).

Safety

In late 1996, the Insurance Institute for Highway Safety (IIHS) crash-tested the 1997 Pontiac Trans Sport (a twin of the Venture). Due to the poor structural performance resulting in extreme damage to the front of the vehicle, it received a "Poor" rating in the  moderate overlap crash test and was ranked the "Worst Performing Vehicle" of all the vehicles tested by the institute, with test results indicating a high risk of serious injury or fatality. This result affected both the Venture's and the Silhouette's safety reputations (as well its test subject, the Pontiac Trans Sport/Montana).

Additionally, its European twin, the Opel/Vauxhall Sintra, also did badly in the Euro NCAP's crash test from 1998 with near-similar results (despite performing well in the side-impact test), with a rating of 2.5 stars (out of 5).

On the other hand, the U.S. National Highway Traffic Safety Administration (NHTSA) gave the 1997 Chevrolet Venture a rating of 4 stars out of 5 in the  frontal-impact test, and 5 stars in the side-impact test. Tests on subsequent model years yielded results of 4 stars in most categories, and 3 or 5 stars in others. This applies to all other U-body minivans of the time. Unlike the IIHS, however, the NHTSA does not conduct moderate overlap crash tests.

The safety issues of the Venture and its U-body siblings would later be addressed with the Uplander in 2005, in which it earned the highest rating of "Good" given by the IIHS institute in the moderate overlap crash test.

References

External links

All-wheel-drive vehicles
Venture
Front-wheel-drive vehicles
Minivans
2000s cars
Cars introduced in 1996
Motor vehicles manufactured in the United States